The mayor of Cebu City is the chief executive of the government of Cebu City in the Philippines. The mayor leads the city's departments in executing ordinances and delivering public services. The mayorship is a three-year term and each mayor is restricted to three consecutive terms, totaling nine years, although a mayor can be elected again after an interruption of one term.

The current mayor is Michael Rama, under BARUG-PDP–Laban. He succeeded the late Edgardo Labella after the latter died in office and was elected in office in  the 2022 elections.

History 
Commonwealth Act No. 38 or the Charter of the City of Cebu, signed on October 20, 1936 and officially inaugurated on February 24, 1937, created the post of City Mayor which shall be appointed by the President of the Philippines with the approval of the Commission on Appointments. President Manuel Quezon appointed Alfredo V. Jacinto of Gapan, Nueva Ecija.

Born on March 23, 1891, Jacinto was not a Cebuano. His first assignment outside of Nueva Ecija was in Manila to become Chief Clerk of the Treasurer's Office of Malolos, Bulacan. Jacinto was transferred to Leyte and then to Pangasinan. In March 1930, he was sent to Cebu after his last assignment in Luzon in La Union. Before he was appointed as City Mayor, he was Provincial Treasurer of Cebu. He resigned from the position on December 31, 1936.

Jacinto took his oath of office at Malacañang Palace before Elpidio Quirino, the Secretary of the Interior on January 7, 1937. Along with him, the following city councilors were sworn into office by Secretary Quirino namely, Manuel Roa (the first President of the Municipal Board), Regino Mercado, Felipe Pacaña, Jose Fortich, Diego Canizares, Jose P. Nolasco, Leandro A. Tojong and Dominador J. Abella.

The next to be appointed was Vicente Rama who served as city mayor from 1938 to 1940. When World War II erupted, Rama sought refuge in Carcar where he was appointed as wartime mayor by the Imperial Japanese Army.

A year before the war, Jose Delgado was appointed as city mayor from 1940 to 1942. Delgado also became governor of Cebu from 1943 to 1944. Next in line was Juan Cerilles Zamora.

Then there was Dr. Leandro Tojong of Ginatilan, Cebu, followed by another doctor, Nicolas Escario of Bantayan, Cebu, followed by lawyer Vicente S. del Rosario, then Dr. Luis Espina, Miguel Raffiñan, Pedro Elizalde, Dr. Jose V. Rodriguez, and Pedro Clavano, all of which were appointed by the president.

On June 7, 1955, the Cebu City Charter was amended by Republic Act No. 1233. The first election for City mayor was held on November 8, 1955 together with the 1955 senatorial elections. The first to be elected as city mayor was Sergio Osmeña Jr. together with his vice mayor Ramon Duterte.

Salary 
As of 2021, the mayor is paid a monthly salary of  based on the second tranche of the Salary Standardization Law of 2019 signed on January 8, 2020 by President Rodrigo Duterte with the position being classified under salary grade 30.

List

Municipality of Cebu 
This is the list of Municipal Presidents of Cebu:

City of Cebu 
This is the list of Mayors of Cebu City:

Notes
 Inaugural Municipal mayor.
 Inaugural City mayor.
 At this time, after the 1986 EDSA Revolution, President Cory Aquino forced the resignation of all local government unit heads and appointed officers in charge in their place.
 Officer-in-charge.
 Acting mayor.
 Died in office.

Timeline of elected city mayors (1986 to present) 

Additional note
As then mayor Michael L. Rama was suspended twice, then vice mayor Edgardo C. Labella served as acting mayor from December 11, 2015 to February 8, 2016 while then city councilor Margarita V. Osmeña served as acting mayor from May 17, 2016 to June 30, 2016.

Vice Mayor of Cebu City 

The vice mayor is the second-highest official of the city elected via popular vote. Although most mayoral candidates have running mates, the vice mayor is elected separately from the mayor. This can result in the mayor and the vice mayor coming from different political parties.

Republic Act No. 244, which was approved on June 12, 1948, provided for the position of vice mayor of the City of Cebu. It was to be appointed by the President of the Philippines with the consent of the Commission on Appointments. The first to be appointed vice mayor by virtue of the provisions of R.A. No. 244 was Arsenio Ruiz Villanueva who took his oath of office on July 16, 1948.

One of the most significant amendments to the Charter of the City of Cebu (C.A. No. 58) came with the approval of Republic Act No. 1243 on June 7, 1955. This particular amendment provided for the election at large, by the qualified voters of the city in conformity with the provisions of the Revised Election Code, of the city mayor and the vice mayor. The first election for city mayor and vice mayor was held during the general election for provincial and municipal officials on November 8, 1955. Chosen as Cebu City's first elected vice mayor was Ramon Gonzales Duterte.

In the Sangguniang Panlungsod, in this case the Cebu City Council, the vice mayor serves as its presiding officer and may vote only to break a tie. The vice mayor is also expected to assume the office of the city mayor and finish the unexpired term in an event of permanent vacancy.

As of 2021, the vice mayor is paid a monthly salary of  based on the second tranche of the Salary Standardization Law of 2019 signed on January 8, 2020 by President Rodrigo Duterte with the position being classified under salary grade 28 for highly urbanized cities like Cebu City.

Donaldo Hontiveros, under BARUG-PDP–Laban was vice mayor from November 2021 to June 2022. He previously served as city councilor after having been elected in 2019 and assumed into office after Rama succeeded the late Edgardo Labella. The current elected vice mayor as of June 2022 is Raymond Alvin Neri who previously served as city councilor.

References

Local government in Cebu City
Cebu City